German submarine U-434 was a Type VIIC U-boat of Nazi Germany's Kriegsmarine during World War II.

The U-boat was laid down on 20 January 1940 at the Schichau-Werke yard, Danzig, launched on 15 March 1941, and commissioned on 21 June 1941, Kapitänleutnant Wolfgang Heyda commanding.

U-434 sailed from Kristiansand, Norway on 2 November 1941, on her only war patrol. On 18 December, U-434 was sunk in the North Atlantic north of Madeira, Portugal, in position . The U-boat was forced to the surface by depth charges from the British escort destroyer  and the destroyer . There were two dead and 42 survivors.

Design
German Type VIIC submarines were preceded by the shorter Type VIIB submarines. U-434 had a displacement of  when at the surface and  while submerged. She had two shafts and two  propellers.

U-434 was fitted with five  torpedo tubes (four fitted at the bow and one at the stern), fourteen torpedoes, one  SK C/35 naval gun, 220 rounds, and a  C/30 anti-aircraft gun. The boat had a complement of between forty-four and sixty.

Wolfpacks
U-434 took part in two wolfpacks, namely:
 Steuben (14 November – 1 December 1941)
 Seeräuber (15 – 18 December 1941)

References

Bibliography

External links

 Movietone News Clip of the sinking of U-434 - Title: U-Boats destroyed in convoy

German Type VIIC submarines
U-boats commissioned in 1941
U-boats sunk in 1941
World War II submarines of Germany
1941 ships
World War II shipwrecks in the Atlantic Ocean
Ships built in Danzig
U-boats sunk by depth charges
U-boats sunk by British warships
Ships built by Schichau
Maritime incidents in December 1941